Arnaud Assoumani (born 4 September 1985) is a T46 French athlete.

He represented France in the F46 long jump at the 2008 Summer Paralympics, and won gold by setting a new world record with a jump of 7.23 metres. He had previously won bronze at the 2004 Games.

, Assoumani is a student at the prestigious Institut d'études politiques de Paris. He is a left forearm amputee.

Arnaud Assoumani is a French athlete from comorian origins, born without a lower left arm on 4 September 1985 at Orsay, near Paris. He grew up at Rochefort-sur-Loire (Maine-et-Loire).

He represented France in the long jump, F46 category, at the 2008 Paralympics Summer Games where he received a gold with a new world record of 7.23 meters.  At the 2004 Paralympics Summer games, he received a bronze in the same event.
He did better than his own world record at the 2010 Bercy French Elite room championship with a 7.82 meter jump.
He tried to compete at the 2012 London Olympic Summer games as a regular competitor, but withdrew following an accident that hurts his Achilles tendon.  He received a silver medal at triple jump at the 2012 Paralympics Summer games, with a 14.28 meter jump.

Arnaud Assoumani studied at the Institut d'études politiques de Paris where he earned a BTS in film cutting and post production in 2006 at EICAR.

He was selected to participate at the 2016 Rio Summer Paralympic games at the Palmarès France room athleticism championship (valids).

Competitions 

Long jump 
  Bronze medal long jump at Paris Bercy

Palmarès at Paralympics Games
Long jump 
  Bronze medal at Athen 2004
  Paralympic champion andworld record 2008 (7,23 m)
  Paralympic  Vice-Champion long jump and triple jump, London, 2012, (7,13 m)
Triple jump
  Paralympic Vice-Champion triple jump, London, 2012 (14,28 m)

Palmarès World Championship (handisport)
Long jump 
  World Champion long jump at Assen, 2006
  World Champion du Monde long jump at Christchurch, 2011
  Bronze medal long jump, Lyon, 2013
100m
  Bronze medal, Christchurch, 2011

Palmarès Europe championship (handisport)
Saut en longueur
  Europe Vice-Champion long jump, Assen, 2003
Saut en hauteur
  Europe Champion high jump, Assen, 2003
Relay 4*100m
  Europe relay champion 4*100m, Assen, 2003

Projects 

In 2012, Arnaud Assoumani started a Golden Arm project, an effort to "graphically customize" prosthesis worn during competitions.

Advertising 

Arnaud Assoumani participates in Samsung advertising campaigns linked to Olympic Games.

Distinctions 
 Honnor Legion

References

External links 
 
 
 
 Arnaud Assoumani at the Fédération Française d'Athlétisme 

Living people
1985 births
Paralympic athletes of France
Athletes (track and field) at the 2004 Summer Paralympics
Athletes (track and field) at the 2008 Summer Paralympics
Athletes (track and field) at the 2012 Summer Paralympics
Paralympic gold medalists for France
Paralympic bronze medalists for France
World record holders in Paralympic athletics
Medalists at the 2004 Summer Paralympics
Medalists at the 2008 Summer Paralympics
Medalists at the 2012 Summer Paralympics
Paralympic silver medalists for France
Paralympic medalists in athletics (track and field)
French amputees
French male sprinters
French male long jumpers
French male triple jumpers
21st-century French people